Acorna's World (2000) is a science fantasy novel by American writers Anne McCaffrey and Elizabeth Ann Scarborough. It was the fourth in the Acorna Universe series initiated by McCaffrey and Margaret Ball in Acorna: The Unicorn Girl (1997). World was preceded by Acorna's People followed by Acorna's Search.

Plot summary

Having come to understand her Linyaari past, Acorna has become a member of the crew of the Condor, a salvage ship. The crew consists of the mildly eccentric Captain Becker, the ship's feline first mate RK (otherwise known as Roadkill), and Aari, a Linyaari who is still scarred physically and emotionally from his capture and subsequent torture by the Khleevi. While searching space for salvage, they come across the wreck of a ship with information indicating that the Khleevi are on the move in that sector of space, and may come to the Linyaari homeworld of Narhii-Viliinyar before long. Acorna and her friends must now warn their people and find a way to stop the oncoming Khleevi horde.

References

2000 American novels
2000 fantasy novels
2000 science fiction novels
Novels by Anne McCaffrey
Acorna